Moose River station is a railway station on the Ontario Northland's Polar Bear Express. The station also provides freight service.

External links
Polar Bear Express Service Map

Ontario Northland Railway stations
Railway stations in Cochrane District